JDC can refer to:
 American Jewish Joint Distribution Committee, a worldwide relief organization
 Jeju Free International City Development Center
 John Deere Classic, a PGA Tour golf tournament
 John Dickson Carr (1906–1977), American mystery writer
 Juvenile detention center
 JDC Welfare Organization
 JDC MotorSports, an American auto racing team